Andrei Andreyevich Mostovoy (born 5 November 1997) is a Russian professional footballer who plays for FC Zenit Saint Petersburg and the Russia national team. He mostly plays as a left winger with some appearances as a right winger as well.

Club career
Mostovoy made his debut in the Russian Professional Football League for FSK Dolgoprudny on 10 April 2016 in a game against FC Znamya Truda Orekhovo-Zuyevo and scored a goal on his debut in his team's 2–0 victory.

On 19 July 2019, he joined PFC Sochi on loan for the 2019–20 season.

Upon his return from loan, on 7 August 2020 he made his debut for FC Zenit Saint Petersburg's senior squad, as a substitute in the 2020 Russian Super Cup game, which Zenit won.

On 5 May 2021, he extended his contract with Zenit throughout the 2023–24 season.

International career
Mostovoy was called up for the Russia national team for the first time for UEFA Nations League games against Serbia and Hungary in September 2020. He made his debut on 8 October 2020 in a friendly against Sweden.

On 11 May 2021, he was included in the preliminary extended 30-man squad for UEFA Euro 2020. On 2 June 2021, he was included in the final squad. On 11 June 2021, he was removed from the squad after testing positive for COVID-19 and replaced by Roman Yevgenyev.

He scored his first international goal on 11 November 2021 in a World Cup qualifier against Cyprus.

Career statistics

Club

International

International goals
Scores and results list Russia's goal tally first.

Honours

Club
Zenit Saint Petersburg
Russian Premier League: 2020–21, 2021–22
Russian Super Cup: 2020, 2021, 2022

References

External links
 
 
 Profile by Russian Professional Football League

1997 births
Living people
Sportspeople from Omsk
Russian footballers
Association football midfielders
Russia international footballers
FC Khimki players
FC Zenit-2 Saint Petersburg players
PFC Sochi players
FC Zenit Saint Petersburg players
Russian Premier League players
Russian First League players
Russian Second League players
FC Lokomotiv Moscow players
FC Olimp-Dolgoprudny players